Ynysddu railway station served the village of Ynysddu, in the historical county of Monmouthshire, Wales, from 1871 to 1960 on the Sirhowy Railway.

History 
The station was opened in August 1871 by the Sirhowy Railway. It closed on 13 June 1960. The site 
is now a hotel.

References 

Disused railway stations in Caerphilly County Borough
Railway stations in Great Britain opened in 1871
Railway stations in Great Britain closed in 1960
1871 establishments in Wales
1960 disestablishments in Wales